Jean or Jean-Baptiste Fischer may refer to:

Jean Fischer (1867–?), French cyclist
 Jean Fischer, Danish engineer
Batty Fischer (Jean-Baptiste Fischer, 1877–1958), Luxembourg dentist and amateur photographer
Jean Chrétien Fischer (1713–62), soldier

See also
Fischer (surname)